Karat Koti (also Romanized as Karāt Kotī; also known as Karatkatī) is a village in Natel-e Restaq Rural District, Chamestan District, Nur County, Mazandaran Province, Iran. At the 2006  census, its population was 757, in 177 families. dehyar abbas masoomi. khabar chin va foozoole mahal hasan yoosefi

References 

Populated places in Nur County